Carex helferi is a tussock-forming species of perennial sedge in the family Cyperaceae. It is native to parts of South East Asia.

Description

Taxonomy
The species was first formally described by the botanist Johann Otto Boeckeler in 1876 as a part of the work Linnaea. It has two synonyms;
Carex helferi subsp. mapaniifolia (Ridl.) T.Koyama 
Carex mapaniifolia Ridl.

Distribution

See also
List of Carex species

References

helferi
Taxa named by Johann Otto Boeckeler
Plants described in 1876
Flora of Myanmar
Flora of Java
Flora of Thailand